Salinas Municipal Stadium was a baseball park located in Salinas, California, United States. Opened in 1949, the stadium was the home field for the Salinas Colts, Salinas Packers, Salinas Indians, Salinas Spurs and Salinas Peppers. When it first opened, the stadium's seating capacity was 2,000. By 1984, it was 3,600.

The Stadium was demolished and replaced with Rabobank Stadium, a football stadium that will serve as home to the football teams of Hartnell College, North Salinas High School, and Palma High School.The stadium sat across the street from Madonna Del Sasso School.

References

Baseball venues in California
Sports venues completed in 1949
1949 establishments in California
Sports in Salinas, California
Sports venues in Monterey County, California
Buildings and structures in Salinas, California
Defunct baseball venues in the United States
Defunct minor league baseball venues